Talamone is a town in Tuscany, on the west coast of central Italy,  administratively a frazione of the comune of Orbetello, province of Grosseto, in the Tuscan Maremma.

Geography

The village lies on a rocky promontory, which lies on the southern border of the Maremma nature reserve, in a dominant position along the whole stretch of coast arriving at Mount Argentario.

The surrounding area is characterized by the presence of vegetation typical of Mediterranean scrub and long sandy beaches, lined by pine trees.

History

An ancient and flourishing city already during the Etruscan period, which saw a decisive battle in 225 BC between Roman and the Celtic armies who were heading for Rome.

Talamone was razed to the ground by Sulla for the support that its citizens gave to Marius in his attempt to march against Rome after the return from his African exile.

Like Orbetello, the late Middle Ages left few marks on Talamone and control was transferred from (among the others) the  Aldobrandeschi to the  Republic of Siena, until in 1559 the territory was ceded to Spain and became part of the State of Presidi.

The port town was also a stage during Admiral Horatio Nelson’s expedition to Egypt in 1798, cited by Napoleon himself as "Tagliamon on the coast of Tuscany". The city's name is also linked to Giuseppe Garibaldi and his Expedition of the Thousand in 1860. In his route towards Sicily, he made a stop there to stock up on water and weapons.

Main sights

Church of Santa Maria Assunta 
Church of Madonna delle Grazie 
Vivarelli Mausoleum (Chapel of the cemetery) 
Towns' Walls 
Rocca Aldobrandesca 
Torre di Capo d'Uomo 
Torre delle Cannelle 
Tower of Talamonaccio

Culture

On the outskirts of Talamone is the southern entrance to the Maremma Natural Park, from where are found some spectacular nature trails.

The local beach of Talamone has become a very popular area to practice the sport of kitesurfing.

In 2008, Talamone was one of the settings used for the James Bond film Quantum of Solace.

See also 
 Albinia
 Ansedonia
 Battle of Telamon
 Fonteblanda
 Giannella
 San Donato, Orbetello
 Talamone Lighthouse

Bibliography
 Guerrini, Giuseppe (a cura di). Torri e castelli della provincia di Grosseto (Amministrazione Provinciale di Grosseto). Siena, Nuova Immagine Editrice, 1999.
 Mazzolai, Aldo. Guida della Maremma. Percorsi tra arte e natura. Florence, Le Lettere, 1997.

External links

 Comune di Orbetello

Cities and towns in Tuscany
Peninsulas of Italy
Frazioni of Orbetello